Sunset Heat may refer to:
 a brand of Escada
 Sunset Heat (film), a 1992 American film by John Nicolella